John Sparke may refer to:

John Sparke (died 1566) English MP for Plympton Erle
John Sparke (died 1640) English MP for Mitchell
John Sparke (died 1680) English MP for Plymouth

See also
John Spark (died 1707) English MP for Newport, Cornwall
John Sparkes, comedian
John Sparks (disambiguation)